Gephyromantis thelenae, commonly known as the Thelen Madagascar frog, is a species of frog in the family Mantellidae.  It is endemic to Madagascar.  Its natural habitats are subtropical or tropical moist lowland forests and plantations.  It is threatened by habitat loss.

References

thelenae
Endemic fauna of Madagascar
Taxonomy articles created by Polbot
Amphibians described in 1994